Thomas H. Bailey (born 1936/37) is an American financier, noted for founding Denver, Colorado-based Janus Capital Group, one of the largest mutual fund institutions in the United States. In 2015, Bailey had an estimated net worth of $1.1 billion.

Bailey has a bachelor's degree from Michigan State University and an MBA from Ivey Business School at the University of Western Ontario.

References

External links
Thomas Bailey ranked #320 on 2005 Forbes 400
Thomas Bailey ranked #322 on 2006 Forbes 400

1930s births
Living people
Michigan State University alumni
American billionaires
People from Aspen, Colorado
University of Western Ontario alumni